DPR Korea Championship (Democratic People's Republic of Korea Championship, Chosŏn'gŭl: 공화국선수권대회; Hanja: 共和國選手權大會) is a multi-sport event in North Korea. This sports games is commonly known as the Republic Championship.

History 
The championship was launched in October, 1972. This championship was held from September through October. 

Initially held every autumn, after 2007 it was held only every other year.

Events

Athletics

Basketball

Football

Swimming

References 

Multi-sport events in North Korea